Laurent Patrick Fignon (12 August 1960 – 31 August 2010) was a French professional road bicycle racer who won the Tour de France in 1983 and 1984 and the Giro d'Italia in 1989. He is former FICP World No. 1 in 1989. He nearly captured the Tour de France for a third time in 1989 before being edged by Greg LeMond by 8 seconds, the closest margin ever to decide the Tour. Fignon won many classic races, including taking Milan–San Remo back-to-back in 1988 and 1989. He died from cancer in 2010.

Early life and amateur career
Fignon was born in Montmartre, Paris. His family moved to Tournan-en-Brie in 1963, where he lived until he left for Paris at age 23.

His first sport was football and he got as far as playing for his  or area. Friends encouraged him into cycling and he rode his first official race in 1976, which he won. Fignon's parents did not want him to race, and he raced without them knowing. He won four more races in his first year, but only one in his second year. In this third year, he won 18 out of 36 races. Fignon's parents allowed him to race, but still thought that he should study. Fignon entered the University of Villetaneuse, studying Structural and Materials Science. Fignon was not interested in his studies, and was an indifferent student.  His chief desire was to pursue cycling. He told his parents that he was leaving the university and would join the army at the end of the year to do his military service.  He was posted at the Bataillon de Joinville, known for its sporting reputation. After this, Fignon was sure he wanted to pursue a professional career.

In 1981, Fignon rode the Tour of Corsica which allowed amateur cyclists to ride along with professional riders. Fignon rode an early stage attempting to hold the wheel of Bernard Hinault, the top professional cyclist, and succeeded for much of the race. Cyrille Guimard observed the young cyclist a few days later at the national 100 km team time trial.Fignon did win on tenth of April 1981 the second stage during  Tour du Vaucluse. In May 1981 he offered him a place on his Renault–Elf–Gitane professional team from the following year.  Fignon joined the team in 1982, along with longtime friend and fellow junior rider Pascal Jules.  Fignon was 21 years of age.

Professional career

1982: first professional season
In 1982, Fignon rode the 1982 Giro d'Italia. After Fignon broke away in the second stage, he became the leader of the race, and got to wear the pink jersey. He lost the lead in the next stage, but became Hinault's most trusted teammate in the mountains.
In Paris–Tours, Fignon had escaped and made a break of 40 seconds, when his crank broke.
During this first year as a professional, Fignon won the Critérium International.

1983: first Tour victory
In 1983, Fignon was a part of the team that helped Bernard Hinault to win the 1983 Vuelta a España. Guimard did not want to send Fignon to the Tour de France, because two grand tours could be too much for a 22-year-old rider. When Hinault, winner of four of the five previous Tours, announced that he would not start due to injury, the Renault team was without a leader. Fignon was added to the 1983 Tour de France selection for the Renault team, and the team decided to go for stage wins, with hopes of having Fignon or Marc Madiot compete for the best debutant category. After stage nine, the first mountain stage, Fignon was in second place, behind Pascal Simon, and he was allowed to be team leader. On the tenth stage, Simon crashed and broke his shoulder blade. Simon continued, and only lost a little time on the next stages. On the fifteenth stage, a mountain time trial, Fignon was able to win back so much time that he was within one minute of Simon.
On the seventeenth stage, Simon had to give up, and Fignon became the new leader. On the next stages, Fignon was able to answer all attacks from his opponents, and he won the time trial on the 21st stage. At 22 years old, Fignon was the youngest man to win the Tour since 1933.

Fignon later said that he was lucky to have won the 1983 Tour: if Hinault had been present Fignon would have helped him, as Hinault was the team leader.

With his round glasses and sophisticated, urbane ("debonaire") demeanor, Fignon was a contrast to Hinault's hard-knocks image. He earned the nickname "The Professor", not only because of these glasses, but also because he was one of the few cyclists who had passed his baccalaureat exams.

Early in his broadcasting career broadcaster and former TDF rider Paul Sherwen referred to Fignon with an alternate version of his nickname during telecasts which into English approximately translates 'The Stern Professor'.

1984: second Tour victory
In 1984, Hinault moved to the new La Vie Claire team, established by the French entrepreneur Bernard Tapie and directed by Swiss coach Paul Koechli. Fignon stayed with the Renault team, and became team leader.
In the 1984 Giro d'Italia, Fignon was in the lead near the end of the race, with Italian Francesco Moser in second place. The highest mountain stage, where Fignon could have extended his lead as the better climber, was cancelled by race organizers "due to bad weather". In one of the more outrageous actions of a major tour, on the final stage, an individual time trial, camera helicopters flew in front of Fignon, creating a headwind, and behind Moser, creating a tailwind. Though Fignon repeatedly shook his fists at the obstructing aircraft, they refused to move off.  Moser ended up gaining enough time to take the overall race lead, with Fignon being moved back to second place.  He later said the experience made him tougher, and prepared him for the hardships to come.

The 1984 Tour de France was a battle between Fignon and his former team leader Hinault. Hinault won the prologue, but Fignon won back time when his team won the team time trial in stage three. After a large escape in the fifth stage, Fignon's teammate Vincent Barteau was leading the race. In the seventh stage, Fignon won the time trial, beating Hinault by 49 seconds. Barteau was still leading the race, and remained the leader after the Pyrenées.

In the sixteenth stage, Fignon again beat Hinault in a time trial, this time winning 33 seconds. In the seventeenth stage, Hinault attacked five times on the penultimate climb, but every time Fignon was able to get back. Then, Fignon left Hinault behind, and won almost three more minutes on Hinault. Barteau was so far behind in this stage, that Fignon became the new leader. Fignon won three more stages, for a total of five that year, and won the Tour with a ten-minute margin.

Had it not been for the questionable incidents which occurred at the Giro this would have been the first time Fignon won the Giro-Tour double. With his air of indifference in interviews and his crushing dominance, he was hailed as France's newest superstar.

1985 and 1986: injury years
Coming into the 1985 season Fignon felt stronger than ever, but two achilles tendon operations caused him to miss the 1985 Tour.  The following season his team took on a new sponsor, and became the Système U cycling team.  In 1986 Fignon won La Flèche Wallonne and he entered the 1986 Tour de France, but placed poorly in the first individual time trial and retired on stage 12 to Pau.

1987 and 1988: return to the top
Fignon returned to near his full strength in 1987, when he finished third in the 1987 Vuelta a España, behind Luis Herrera. Later that year, he finished 7th overall in the 1987 Tour de France, taking another victory at La Plagne (stage 21).
In 1988, Fignon won Milan–San Remo, but had to abandon the 1988 Tour.

1989: losing by 8 seconds

In 1989, Fignon overtook Sean Kelly as leader of the UCI Road World Rankings. That season included a win at Milan–San Remo and the Giro d'Italia. During the Giro he defeated Flavio Giupponi, Erik Breukink and defending champion Andrew Hampsten. Fignon seized the Maglia Rosa on stage 14 and held it for the remainder of the race; he also won stage 20.

In the 1989 Tour de France, 1988 winner Pedro Delgado was the big favourite, with Fignon, Stephen Roche, and Erik Breukink listed together as top contenders. After Delgado inexplicably was nearly three minutes late for the start of the prologue time trial, the race was open to all contenders, and ended up a battle between Greg LeMond and Fignon. LeMond won a minute in the time trial in stage five, using aerobars which enabled a new and more aerodynamic riding position (also known as tri-bars as they had previously only been used in triathlons), a new type of teardrop-shaped aerodynamic helmet in the time trials and a rear disc wheel, Fignon used normal road handlebars and a bicycle with both front and rear disc wheels, which left him more affected by cross winds. LeMond led the general classification after that stage by 5 seconds. In the tenth stage, Fignon beat LeMond by 12 seconds, and became the new leader, 7 seconds ahead of LeMond. In the time trial of stage 15, LeMond again won time on Fignon, and took back the leading position. Fignon came back by dropping LeMond on Alpe d'Huez, taking back the lead, and after he won alone at Villard-de-Lans the next day, the margin was 50 seconds.
Before the final stage, a short time trial of 24.5 km, the time difference between LeMond and Fignon was 50 seconds, a seemingly insurmountable amount. To win, LeMond would have to take two seconds a kilometer on one of the fastest time trialists in the Tour. French newspapers prepared special editions, with Fignon's picture on the front page, in preparation for his victory. Although it was considered unlikely that LeMond would be able to win back 50 seconds on the 24.5 km, LeMond gave his best, and rode the fastest time trial until 2015. Fignon had developed saddle sores in stage 19, which gave him pain and made it impossible to sleep in the night before the time trial. Fignon, who rode after LeMond, lost 58 seconds during the stage.  Fignon rode a very fast time trial, and came in third for the stage, but still ended up losing the overall lead to LeMond.
It was suggested afterwards that if Fignon had cut off his ponytail, the reduction in drag might have been sufficient for him to have won the Tour. Had Fignon held on to win the Tour it would have been the first time he completed the Giro-Tour Double.

During that Tour, he was on bad terms with the journalists.  He often refused to smile for photographs, and at one point spat into the lens of a cameraman who asked for an interview.  For his efforts the press awarded Fignon the "Prix Citron" ("Lemon Prize"), a prize the press awarded to whom they thought the least likable rider. The loss of the 1989 Tour was a heavy burden for Fignon, and in his autobiography he said "you never stop grieving over an event like that".

He came back after the Tour de France that year to win decidedly the Grand Prix des Nations time trial, an event that was considered at the time to be the world championships of time trials. This time he used aero handlebar extensions.  He also showed his versatility winning the Polynormande, Critérium des As (a race in which each rider motorpaces behind a derny), and the two-man Trofeo Baracchi (which he won with teammate and fellow Frenchman Thierry Marie).

1990–1993: later years
Fignon withdrew from the 1990 Tour, but finished 6th in 1991. Following this Fignon moved over to the Italian Gatorade team to act as co-captain and advisor to promising young talent Gianni Bugno. After a dramatic 1992 Giro d'Italia, in which he was in heavy crisis during mountain stages, he rode his last Tour that same year, finishing 23rd overall.  The race saw an angered Fignon take his ninth stage win, holding off a series of attacks by Guimard's Castorama team before winning at Mulhouse during stage 11. Fignon's last victory as professional cyclist was in the early-season Ruta Mexico in 1993, after a tight duel with Francisco Villalobos and surviving a massive collision that saw the group hit by a tow truck driven by a drunken man. Fignon retired as a professional cyclist late 1993.

Doping
Fignon tested positive for amphetamines at the Grand Prix de Wallonie, in 1987, where he finished third. He was subsequently disqualified from the final result but claimed, in his autobiography, that the positive test was the result of a commercial dispute between two Belgian companies.

Fignon tested positive for amphetamines a second time, at the Grand Prix de la Liberation, on 17 September 1989.

In his autobiography, Fignon admitted to using recreational drugs, and occasionally using stimulants in the 1980s.  He noted this was widespread, and that the practice would not dramatically change the capabilities of a rider. He noted major changes in the sport in the early 1990s with the onset of routine use of Human Growth Hormone and the blood-booster, EPO. Fignon stated he was revolted by the idea of taking hormones to enhance performance, and the mere suggestion he refused out of hand.  He retired from competition in 1993 when he realized that cycling had changed, and that he no longer had a place in it.

After retirement
In 1995, Fignon founded the "Laurent Fignon organisation", to organize races, notably Paris–Nice, from 2000 until it was taken over by Amaury Sport Organisation (ASO), the organiser of Tour de France, in 2002. Fignon remained an organiser for races such as Paris–Corrèze.

In response to assertions that French riders were less successful over recent years due to the tight doping controls that French riders are subject to, Fignon responded frankly: "The sports directors don't do a good job any more. They lack competence and don't have authority over their riders. The non-results of French teams are not only the consequences of doping."

On his relationships with Cyrille Guimard and Bernard Hinault, Fignon said that with Bernard Hinault, Guimard already found a champion, whereas with himself, Guimard made him a champion. Therefore, his bond with Guimard was stronger than Hinault's bond with Guimard.

Fignon wrote an autobiography entitled Nous étions jeunes et insouciants ("We were young and carefree"), which was released in June 2009.

Death
In June 2009, Fignon revealed that he was undergoing chemotherapy for metastatic cancer. He noted that early in his career he had dabbled with recreational drugs, amphetamines and cortisone, but did not believe they played a role in his illness.  Amphetamine use during the criterium portion (late summer/early fall) of the cycling season was commonplace in the seventies and eighties. Fignon's cancer was diagnosed in April 2009 after metastatic tumors were found in his digestive system.

In January 2010, his doctors discovered that the cancer had originated in his lungs.  Fignon died at Pitié-Salpêtrière Hospital on 31 August 2010, at 12.30 pm. He was 50 years old. Fignon was survived by his wife and both of his parents. He was also survived by his son and daughter from his first marriage.

His funeral took place on 3 September 2010 at Père Lachaise Cemetery, Paris, where he was later cremated.

Former fellow champion Greg LeMond said:
"It's a really sad day. He had a very, very big talent, much more than anyone recognised. We were teammates, competitors, but also friends. He was a great person, one of the few that I find was really true to himself. He was one of the few riders who I really admired for his honesty and his frankness. We talked about a lot of different things outside of cycling and I was fortunate to really get to know him when my career stopped. I believe he was also one of the generation that was cut short in the early nineties because he was not able to fulfill the rest of his career. But he was a great rider."
His ashes were placed in the columbarium of the Père Lachaise cemetery.

Career achievements

Major results

1981
 1st Stage 2 Tour du Vaucluse
1982
 1st  Overall Critérium International
 1st Flèche Azuréene
 1st Garancières-en-Beauce
 1st GP de Cannes
 1st Stage 1 (TTT) Giro d'Italia
 2nd Overall Tour du Vaucluse
1st Stage 1
 3rd Overall Étoile des Espoirs
1983
 1st  Overall Tour de France
1st   Young rider classification
1st Stage 21 (ITT)
 1st Grand Prix de Plumelec-Morbihan
 1st Grand Prix Le Télégramme de Brest
 1st Prologue Tour d'Armorique
 1st Stage 3 Tour du Limousin
 1st Stage 1 Critérium International
 3rd Polynormande
 7th Overall Vuelta a España
1st Stage 4
 7th Overall Tirreno–Adriatico
1st Stage 4
1984
 1st  Road race, National Road Championships
 1st  Overall Tour de France
1st Stages 3 (TTT), 7 (ITT), 16 (ITT), 18, 20 & 22 (ITT)
 1st Stage 9 Clásico RCN
 2nd Overall Giro d'Italia
1st  Mountains classification
1st Stages 1 (TTT) & 20
 3rd Grand Prix de Fourmies
 4th Grand Prix Le Télégramme de Brest
 7th Overall Tour de Romandie
1st Prologue & Stage 4
 8th Liège–Bastogne–Liège
1985
 1st  Overall Settimana Internazionale di Coppi e Bartali
1st Stage 4a
 1st Prologue Étoile de Bessèges
 2nd Overall Route du Sud
1st Prologue
 3rd La Flèche Wallonne
 3rd Brabantse Pijl
 5th Liège–Bastogne–Liège
1986
 1st Stage 2 (TTT) Tour de France
 1st La Flèche Wallonne
 1st Bol d'Or des Monédières
 1st Stage 2 Critérium du Dauphiné Libéré
 2nd Overall Escalada a Montjuich
 2nd Overall Tour du Vaucluse
 2nd Grand Prix des Nations
 2nd Paris–Camembert
 7th Overall Vuelta a España
 7th Overall Three Days of De Panne
 8th Overall Tour Méditerranéen
 10th Grand Prix Eddy Merckx
1987
 1st Stage 6 Ronde van Nederland
 2nd Overall Tour de Luxembourg
 2nd Overall Étoile de Bessèges
1st Stage 3a (ITT)
 3rd Overall Paris–Nice
1st Stages 5 & 7a
 3rd Overall Vuelta a España
1st  Combination classification
1st Stage 19
 3rd Overall Tour du Vaucluse
 3rd Grand Prix Le Télégramme de Brest
 5th Overall Critérium International
 6th Overall Volta a Catalunya
 6th Liège–Bastogne–Liège
 7th Overall Tour de France
1st Stage 21
1988
 1st Milan–San Remo
 1st Paris–Camembert
 2nd Overall Critérium International
1st Stage 2
 2nd Grand Prix de Wallonie
 2nd Paris–Brussels
 2nd Grand Prix des Nations
 3rd Paris–Roubaix
 4th Overall Route du Sud
1st Prologue & Stage 1
 5th Overall Paris–Nice
 6th Overall Étoile de Bessèges
 9th Overall Ronde van Nederland
1989
 1st UCI World Ranking
 1st  Overall Giro d'Italia
1st Stage 20
 1st  Overall Ronde van Nederland
 1st Milan–San Remo
 1st Grand Prix des Nations
 1st Polynormande
 1st Critérium des As
 1st Trofeo Baracchi (with Thierry Marie)
 2nd Overall Tour de France
1st Stages 2 (TTT) & 18
Held  after Stages 10–14 & 17–20
 Combativity award
 3rd Grand Prix Le Télégramme de Brest
 4th Overall Tour de Romandie
 6th Overall Critérium International
 6th Overall Tour Méditerranéen
 6th Road race, UCI Road World Championships
 7th Liège–Bastogne–Liège
1990
 1st  Overall Critérium International
 3rd Critérium des As
 4th Overall Paris–Nice
 8th Overall Route du Sud
1991
 1st Stage 5 Giro di Puglia
 6th Overall Tour de France
 10th Overall Paris–Nice
1992
 1st Stage 11 Tour de France
 8th Overall Euskal Bizikleta
1993
 1st  Overall Ruta Mexico
1st Stage 6

Grand Tours general classification results timeline

References
Notes

Citations

Bibliography

 Fignon, Laurent, translation by William Fotheringham We Were Young and Carefree. London, UK: Yellow Jersey Press, 2010. .
 McGann, Bill and Carol McGann  The Story of the Tour de France, Vol 2. Indianapolis: Dog Ear Publishing, 2008. .

External links

 
 Official Tour de France results of Laurent Fignon
 

1960 births
2010 deaths
Cycling announcers
Deaths from lung cancer in France
Doping cases in cycling
French sportspeople in doping cases
French Tour de France stage winners
French Vuelta a España stage winners
French Giro d'Italia stage winners
Giro d'Italia winners
Cyclists from Paris
Tour de France winners
UCI Road World Rankings winners
Sorbonne Paris North University alumni